A City Story was a Canadian
documentary television series which aired on CBC Television in 1971.

Premise
Sixteen Canadian cities were featured in this series of documentaries, originally produced in 1967. The films were first broadcast locally in Toronto and Montreal in 1968, only reaching the national network in October 1971 when these were broadcast at random times.

References

External links
 

CBC Television original programming
1971 Canadian television series debuts
1971 Canadian television series endings